The 2014–15 KHL season was the seventh season of the Kontinental Hockey League. The season started on 3 September with the Opening Cup between defending champions Metallurg Magnitogorsk and Dynamo Moscow, replacing Lev Praha, last year's runner up not participating this season.

Team changes
Prior to the season, the KHL added three more teams: Jokerit from Helsinki, Lada Togliatti (an earlier member of the KHL that spent the last four seasons in the VHL) and HC Sochi, an expansion team from Sochi.

HC Donbass did not play in the league this season, due to Russian invasion of Ukraine which culminated in a devastating fire at their home arena. Donbass intended to rejoin KHL for the 2015–16 season, but ultimately joined the new Ukrainian Hockey Extra League. HC Lev Praha didn't participate in KHL this season either, because of financial problems. In addition, Spartak Moscow did not participate in the league this season, after missing the deadline for shoring up its finances.

Divisions and regular season format
New for this season, is that the teams primarily play games against teams in their own division, and secondarily against teams in their own conference, and finally against teams in the other conference. According to the new format (subject to final approval by the League management) each team will play a total of 60 games during the regular season as follows:

 24 games against the other teams in their division (two at home and two on the road against each opponent), 
 14 games (one at home and one on the road against each opponent),  against the teams in the other division in their conference, 
 14 more against teams from the other conference (comprising seven home games versus teams from one division and seven road games against teams from the other),
 8 games where four will be against teams in their own conference (two at home, two on the road) and four against opposition from the other conference (again, two at home and two on the road). When determining the opponents and venues for these additional 8 games, the League consider practical things, including the geographical locations and the availability of the arenas.

How the teams are divided into divisions and conferences are shown in the table below.

Regular season
The regular season began on 3 September 2014 with the Opening Cup between Metallurg Magnitogorsk and Dynamo Moscow. Metallurg won the game 6–1.

Player statistics

Scoring leaders

  
GP = Games played; G = Goals; A = Assists; Pts = Points; +/– = Plus-minus; PIM = Penalty minutes

Leading goaltenders

GP = Games played; Min = Minutes played; W = Wins; L = Losses; SOP = Shootouts played; GA = Goals against; SO = Shutouts; SV% = Save percentage; GAA = Goals against average

Russian Ice Hockey Championship

At the end of the regular season of the KHL Championship the following teams became medalists of the Russian Ice Hockey Championship:

Playoffs

The playoffs started on February 27, 2015, with the top eight teams from each of the conferences and will end with the last game of the Gagarin Cup final.

Final standings

Awards

Players of the Month

Best KHL players of each month.

Milestones

On September 13, 2014, the Metallurg Magnitogorsk forward Sergei Mozyakin recorded his 400th KHL regular season career point. He became the first player in league history to reach this milestone.
On September 24, 2014, the Metallurg Magnitogorsk forward Danis Zaripov recorded his 300th KHL regular season career point. He became the third player in league history to reach this milestone.
On October 5, 2014, Ak Bars Kazan coach Zinetula Bilyaletdinov coached his 800th career game in Russian championships.
On October 6, 2014, Torpedo Nizhny Novgorod forward Wojtek Wolski set a new league record for the fastest hat-trick in the game against Sibir Novosibirsk scoring in 1 minute 46 seconds.
On February 18, 2015, Jokerit forward Steve Moses scored his 36th goal against Atlant Moscow Oblast and broke the league record for the most goals scored during one season.

References

 
Kontinental Hockey League seasons
1
1
2014–15 in Finnish ice hockey